Lan Samantha Chang (張嵐; pinyin: Zhāng Lán) is an American writer of novels and short stories.

Life 
Lan Samantha Chang was born in Appleton, Wisconsin, and attended Yale University, where she earned her bachelor's degree in East Asian Studies. She worked briefly in publishing in New York City, before getting her MPA from the Kennedy School of Government at Harvard University. She is a graduate of the Iowa Writers' Workshop and was a Wallace E. Stegner Fellow in Fiction at Stanford. She is the Elizabeth M. Stanley Professor in the Arts at the University of Iowa and the Director of the Iowa Writers' Workshop. She is the first woman, and the first Asian American, to hold that position.

Work 
Chang's first book is a novella and short stories, titled Hunger (1998). The stories are set in the US and China, and they explore home, family, and loss. The New York Times Book Review called it "Elegant.… A delicately calculated balance sheet of the losses and gains of immigrants whose lives are stretched between two radically different cultures." The Washington Post called it "A work of gorgeous, enduring prose." Her first novel, Inheritance (2004), is about a family torn apart by the Japanese invasion during World War II. The Boston Globe said: "The story…is foreign in its historical sweep and social detail but universal in its emotional truth." Chang's second novel, All Is Forgotten, Nothing is Lost (2011), follows two poets and their friendship as they explore the depths and costs of making art. The book received a starred review from Booklist and praise: "Among the many threads Chang elegantly pursues—the fraught relationships between mentors and students, the value of poetry, the price of ambition—it is her indelible portrait of the loneliness of artistic endeavor that will haunt readers the most in this exquisitely written novel about the poet’s lot." Chang's fourth book and third novel, The Family Chao, was published by the W. W. Norton & Company. Barack Obama chose The Family Chao for his 2022 summer reading list. The Family Chao was a Jeopardy! clue on October 6, 2022.

Chang has received fellowships from MacDowell, the American Library in Paris, the Guggenheim Foundation, the Radcliffe Institute for Advanced Study, and the National Endowment for the Arts.

Directorship 
As the sixth director of the Iowa Writers' Workshop, Chang has been fundamental to the increase of racial, cultural, and aesthetic diversity within the program, and has mentored a number of emerging writers. In 2019, she received the Michael J. Brody Award and the Regents' Award for Excellence from the University of Iowa.

Awards and distinctions 

 1993 : Wallace E. Stegner Fellow, Stanford University
 1998 : Rona Jaffe Foundation Writers' Award
 1998 : National Endowment for the Arts, Creative Writing Fellowship in Prose
 1999 : Silver Medal for Fiction, California Book Award
 1999 : Finalist, Art Seidenbaum Award for First Fiction, Los Angeles Times Book Awards
 1999 : Alfred Hodder Fellow, Princeton University
 2000 : Radcliffe Fellow, Radcliffe Institute for Advanced Study, Harvard University
 2005 : PEN Open Book Award
 2008 : John Simon Guggenheim Fellowship
 2015 : American Library in Paris Visiting Fellowship 
 2016 : Doctor of Humane Letters, Lawrence University
 2021 : Berlin Prize Fellow, American Academy in Berlin

Bibliography 

Books
 Hunger: A Novella and Stories (W.W. Norton & Company, 1998)   
Inheritance: A Novel (W. W. Norton & Company, 2004) 
All Is Forgotten, Nothing Is Lost: A Novel (W. W. Norton & Company, 2010) 
The Family Chao: A Novel (W. W. Norton & Company, 2022)
Stories
 "Pipa’s Story", The Atlantic Monthly, August, 1993  The Best American Short Stories 1994
 "New House", The Greensboro Review 57 (1994–95); Fish Stories: Collective I Honorable Mention for Fiction, Greensboro Review Literary Awards Distinguished Story of 1995, The Best American Short Stories
 "The Eve of the Spirit Festival", Prairie Schooner 69:1 (1995) Prairie Schooner Readers' Choice Award for Fiction  The Best American Short Stories 1996
 "A Dream of Western Music", Stanford Today 1:1 (1996) Distinguished Story of 1997, The Best American Short Stories
 "San", Story 44:1 (1996) Distinguished Story of 1997, The Best American Short Stories  Special Mention, Pushcart Prize, 1998
 "A Genealogy of Longing", Story 47:4 (1999) Distinguished Story of 2000, The Best American Short Stories
 "The Cottage", Freeman's, Grove Atlantic, (2018) Distinguished Story of 2018, The Best American Short Stories
Selected Nonfiction

 "Pass the Turkey. And the Stir-Fry," The New York Times, November 26, 1998
 "And Iowa Now", The New York Times, January 3, 2008
 "Volvos from Florida", The New York Times, March 7, 2009
 "Writers, Protect Your Inner Life," Lit Hub, August 7, 2017

See also 

List of Asian American writers
Yale Daily News
Iowa Writers' Workshop
Iowa Writers' Workshop Alumni

Critical studies 
Jonathan Freedman. "Transgressions of a Model Minority." Shofar: An Interdisciplinary Journal of Jewish Studies, 2005 Summer; 23 (4): 69–97.
Hetty Lanier Keaton. Feeding Hungry Ghosts: Food, Family, and Desire in Stories by Contemporary Chinese American Women.  Dissertation Abstracts International, Section A: The Humanities and Social Sciences, 2002 July; 63 (1): 187–88. U of Tulsa, 2002.

References

External links
Short biography and interview (archived 2003)

1965 births
Living people
American writers of Chinese descent
Harvard Kennedy School alumni
Iowa Writers' Workshop alumni
Rona Jaffe Foundation Writers' Award winners
Stanford University alumni
University of Iowa alumni
University of Iowa faculty
Writers from Appleton, Wisconsin
Yale College alumni